Quách Hoài Nam (born 25 November 1969) is a Vietnamese swimmer. He competed in two events at the 1988 Summer Olympics.

References

External links
 

1969 births
Living people
Vietnamese male swimmers
Olympic swimmers of Vietnam
Swimmers at the 1988 Summer Olympics
Place of birth missing (living people)